Al Mirqab (also referred to as Fereej Al Mirqab) is a district in Qatar, located in the municipality of Ad Dawhah.

Together with As Salatah, it makes up Zone 18 which has 692 people in it.

Etymology
An Arabic word, mirqab is derived from "muraqabah", which in English translates to "watching". This name was given in reference to a large hill in the area on which people would gather to spot ships out on sea.

Geography
Al Mirqab borders the following districts:
Al Souq to the west, separated by Jabr Bin Mohammed Street.
Doha Port to the north, separated by Corniche Street.
As Salatah to the east, separated by Ali Bin Amur Al Attiyah Street.
Al Rufaa to the south, separated by Al Mathaf (Museum) Street.

Transport
Currently, the underground Al Mirqab Metro Station is under construction, having been launched during Phase 2C. Once completed, it will be part of Doha Metro's Gold Line.

See also
New Al Mirqab

References

Communities in Doha